Anneliese Jane Dodds (born 16 March 1978) is a British Labour and Co-operative politician and public policy analyst serving as Shadow Secretary of State for Women and Equalities, and Chair of the Labour Party since 2021. She was Shadow Chancellor of the Exchequer from April 2020 to May 2021, the first woman to hold the position. She has been Member of Parliament (MP) for Oxford East since 2017 and was a Member of the European Parliament (MEP) for South East England from 2014 to 2017.

Born in Aberdeen and privately educated at Robert Gordon's College, Dodds read Philosophy, Politics and Economics as an undergraduate at St Hilda's College, Oxford and subsequently took a master's degree in Social Policy at the University of Edinburgh and a PhD in Government at the London School of Economics. She lectured in Public Policy at King’s College London and Aston University. After joining the Labour Party, she unsuccessfully contested Billericay at the 2005 general election and Reading East at the 2010 general election.

Dodds was elected to the European Parliament at the 2014 European Parliament election. She resigned her South East England seat when she was elected to the House of Commons at the 2017 general election. She served in the Shadow Treasury Team of Shadow Chancellor John McDonnell as Shadow Financial Secretary to the Treasury from 2017 to 2020. In this role, she supported calls for a confirmatory referendum on Britain's withdrawal from the European Union. In April 2020, she was appointed Shadow Chancellor of the Exchequer by new Labour leader Keir Starmer. She was demoted from the role in a reshuffle after the 2021 local elections, and appointed Chair of the Party and Policy Review. She gained the additional Shadow Women and Equalities Secretary brief in September 2021, following Marsha de Cordova's resignation.

Early life and career 
Anneliese Jane Dodds was born in Aberdeen, Scotland and was educated at the council-run Dunnottar Primary School and, later, the private co-educational day school Robert Gordon's College. She moved to southeast England in 1996, where she studied Philosophy, Politics and Economics at St Hilda's College, Oxford. While at Oxford, she was involved with student activism and ran for president of Oxford University Student Union (OUSU) in 1998. She was fined £75 for breaking election rules by canvassing using email. In 1999, she became OUSU president, serving until 2000. She took part in protests against the introduction of tuition fees in 2000 and in support of LGBT rights. She graduated in 2001 with a first-class degree.

Dodds later studied for a master's degree in Social Policy at the University of Edinburgh, and a PhD degree in Government at the London School of Economics, where she completed a thesis on liberalisation in higher education in France and the UK in 2006. She also had her postdoctoral fellowship at the LSE funded by the Economic and Social Research Council.

Dodds was a lecturer in Public Policy at King’s College London from 2007 to 2010 and a senior lecturer in Public Policy at Aston University from 2010 to 2014. Her research interests have been stated as being in regulation and risk in the public sector, and she has been published in journals such as The Political Quarterly, Public Policy and Administration, and the British Journal of General Practice. In 2018, the second edition of her book, Comparative Public Policy, was published by Red Globe Press, an imprint of Palgrave Macmillan.

Political career

Dodds stood unsuccessfully for election in the constituency of Billericay at the 2005 general election and the constituency of Reading East at the 2010 general election. She was also unsuccessful in the 2006 Oxford City council elections for the ward of Holywell.

Dodds was elected as a Member of the European Parliament for the South East England region in 2014. In the European Parliament, she sat on the Committee on Economic and Monetary Affairs. In the 2015 Labour leadership election, she supported Yvette Cooper.

Dodds was elected as the Member of Parliament for Oxford East at the 2017 snap general election, succeeding Andrew Smith. On 3 July 2017, she was appointed as a Shadow Treasury Minister by Labour leader Jeremy Corbyn. In April 2019, she supported calls for a second Brexit referendum. She was Vice-Chair of the All-Party Parliamentary Group on Whistleblowing from 2018 to 2019.

On 5 April 2020, Dodds was appointed Shadow Chancellor of the Exchequer by new Labour leader Keir Starmer, becoming the first woman to hold this position. Some commentators argued that she struggled to make an impact on the political discussion in the context of generous government spending during the COVID-19 pandemic. In March 2021, The Sunday Times reported that Starmer was preparing to dismiss Dodds. Two months later, after a set of relatively poor results for Labour at the 2021 local elections she was removed from her position in a shadow cabinet reshuffle and replaced with Rachel Reeves. She was then given a role previously held by Deputy Leader Angela Rayner as the party's chair.

Dodds became Shadow Secretary of State for Women and Equalities in September 2021, following the resignation of previous office holder Marsha de Cordova.

Political positions
LabourList has described Dodds as a "unity candidate", explaining that although she is not a Corbynite, she is supported by her predecessor as Shadow Chancellor, John McDonnell, and the Financial Times has said that she is on the "soft left" of the party. In terms of her position on Brexit, she is a remainer, and supported calls for a second referendum on the issue.

While Labour candidate for Reading East in the 2010 election, she explained several of her policy positions, including how she wouldn't take the full salary available to MPs if elected, instead, only taking the average salary of the constituency and "invest[ing] the rest in an improved service" for constituents. On the economy, she argued for increased support for those who need retraining, and those who are long-term unemployed. Furthermore, she stated her desire for "smarter" regulation of the financial system. In terms of criminal justice, she said that helping drug addicts end their dependency, and prosecuting drug dealers whose customers end up dying was important; and in terms of education, she maintained it was important to "better join up children’s services across the fields of education, child care, health care and social services".

She described the problem of climate change as a "climate ’emergency’", and wanted to see "far more radical change" to protect against the risks of climate change, suggesting several actions that could help do so, such as banning domestic flights, making it easier to build wind farms, and increased investment in green technology. However, she further explained how these actions should be "realistic and fair", and not be funded by "expensive green taxes". In September 2019, she wrote on her website that she had taken part in climate marches, and explained her interest in ideas to promote increasing cycling and public transport in Oxford, and how "we simply cannot return to business as usual in the next parliamentary session".

During the 2019 general election campaign, she argued in support of Labour's plans to increase corporation tax because she believes "those with the broadest shoulders" should contribute more.

After being appointed Shadow Chancellor in early 2020, she stated that she remained committed to "co-operative and mutual ownership", as was supported under Corbyn's leadership of the party, and opposed the introduction of a universal basic income.

Personal life 
Dodds lives in Rose Hill, Oxford and is the partner of Labour Party councillor Ed Turner, the deputy leader of Oxford City Council, and has a son and daughter.

Publications
Comparative Public Policy (2018, 2nd ed.)

References

External links

|-

|-

|-

1978 births
Living people
People educated at Robert Gordon's College
21st-century women MEPs for England
Academics of Aston University
Academics of King's College London
Alumni of St Hilda's College, Oxford
Alumni of the London School of Economics
Alumni of the University of Edinburgh
Female members of the Parliament of the United Kingdom for English constituencies
Labour Co-operative MEPs
Labour Co-operative MPs for English constituencies
MEPs for England 2014–2019
People from Aberdeen
UK MPs 2017–2019
UK MPs 2019–present
Shadow Chancellors of the Exchequer